Shendan may refer to:
Shendan Expressway, in China
Shendan, South Khorasan, a village in Iran